The Arbroath Herald Guide and Gazette, usually referred to simply as The Arbroath Herald, is a local newspaper covering events in and around Arbroath, Angus, Scotland. The Arbroath Herald is released weekly on a Friday.

History
Established in 1838, the paper has had just seven editors. Up until 1975 the newspaper was printed in the burgh. The "Herald" was bought by the Johnston Press in 1998 at which time its circulation was approximately 7000 per week. In 2005 the Johnston Press reported its circulation was up to 10,030.
2004 was the first time news items were carried on the front page, where previously adverts and notices were displayed.

Historical copies of the Arbroath Herald, dating back to 1889, are available to search and view in digitised form at The British Newspaper Archive.

References

External links
Official website
 The Johnston Press

Newspapers established in 1838
Newspapers published in Scotland
Newspapers in Scotland
1838 establishments in Scotland
Newspapers published by Johnston Press
Arbroath